Hoogeveen Airport (Dutch: Vliegveld Hoogeveen)  is a small general aviation airfield located  northeast of Hoogeveen, a town in the northeastern Netherlands. There are several flying clubs and flying schools located at the airport. Once per year the special event Wings and Wheels is hosted here. It is a show with classic planes and cars. Special aircraft from all over The Netherlands, Germany and Belgium come to show them to the people. There is also a steakhouse on the grounds.

Fokker 
The Airport was initially intended for the Fokker company when they made their older Propeller airplanes.

See also 
 List of airports in the Netherlands

References 

 Vliegveld Hoogeveen (official website)

External links 
 

Airports in Drenthe
Hoogeveen